Gerard Robert Wyatt (3 September 1925, Palo Alto, California – 28 March 2019, Kingston, Ontario) was an American-Canadian biochemist and entomologist, specializing in insect physiology. He is known for important research on DNA.

Biography
Gerard Wyatt, as a boy of age eight with his family, immigrated to Canada. He attended Victoria College but transferred to the University of British Columbia, where he graduated in 1945 with a bachelor's degree in zoology. He then worked for a year at the UC Berkeley laboratory of Edward Steinhaus, an expert on insect-transmitted pathogens. In 1946 Wyatt returned to Canada to work at the new Laboratory of Insect Pathology in Sault Ste. Marie, Ontario. From 1947 to 1950 he was a research student in biochemistry at the Molteno Institute in Cambridge, England. He received his PhD from the University of Cambridge. In 1950 he returned to Ontario to work at the Laboratory of Insect Pathology. Wyatt was a Guggenheim Fellow for the academic year 1954–1955. From 1954 to 1973 he was a member of the faculty of Yale University. There he did important research on the biochemistry of insect hemolymph and sugars and polysaccharides in insects. From 1973 until his retirement in 1994, he was a professor at Queen's University at Kingston. There he started an African migratory locust facility. (Because of Canada's cold climate, African locusts were not regarded as an invasive species threat.) In 1990 Wyatt became the scientific director of Insect Biotech Canada, with 25 scientists working as a team on insect control.

He was elected a Fellow of the Royal Society of Canada in 1981.

In 1950 Wyatt married Sarah Silver Morton, who died in 1981. Upon his death he was survived by his second wife, three children from his first marriage, as well as two step-children, and several grandchildren and great-grandchildren.

Research on DNA

According to James D. Watson:

References

Sources 

 Gerard Robert Wyatt's personal papers archive is available for study at the Wellcome Collection, London (some of the material is digitised and digitally accessible via the website).

1925 births
2019 deaths
Canadian biochemists
Canadian entomologists
University of British Columbia Faculty of Science alumni
Alumni of the University of Cambridge
Yale University faculty
Academic staff of Queen's University at Kingston
Fellows of the Royal Society of Canada
American emigrants to Canada